Noshir S. Contractor is an Indian-American network scientist who is the Jane S. & William J. White Professor of Behavioral Sciences in the McCormick School of Engineering & Applied Science, the School of Communication and the Kellogg School of Management and the director of the Science of Networks in Communities (SONIC) Research Group  at Northwestern University. He is also the President-Elect-Select of the International Communication Association (ICA) and a Trustee of the Web Science Trust.

Education
Contractor completed his Doctor of Philosophy degree in communication at the University of Southern California in 1987. Prior to this he received a Master of Arts in Communication also from USC in 1986 and a Bachelor of Technology in Electrical Engineering from the Indian Institute of Technology Madras (Chennai) in 1983.

Career

Research
He has published more than 250 research papers in the area of social communication networks. He is known for the Multi-Theoretical Multi-Level (MTML) Framework with Peter Monge described in detail in Theories of Communication Networks. He was one of the principal investigators of the  Virtual Worlds Observatory project along with Jaideep Srivastava, Marshall Scott Poole and Dmitri William.

Recognition
In 2014, Professor Contractor was awarded the prestigious National Communication Association (NCA) Distinguished Scholar Award, honoring "a lifetime of scholarly achievement in the study of human communication." 
In 2015, Professor Contractor was honored with the title of International Communication Association (ICA) Fellow, in recognition of "distinguished scholarly contributions to the broad field of communication." 
In 2018, he was awarded a Distinguished Alumnus Award of the Indian Institute of Technology Madras.
In 2019, he was elected as a Fellow of the American Association for the Advancement of Science (AAAS)  and an ACM Fellow "for contributions to advances in computational social science, network science and web science".

References

Living people
21st-century American psychologists
1959 births
Indian emigrants to the United States
American people of Indian descent
American people of Parsi descent
University of Southern California alumni
Fellows of the Association for Computing Machinery
Network scientists
20th-century American psychologists